Erdoğan Kaya (born 27 March 2001) is a Turkish professional footballer who plays for Serik Belediyespor on loan from Beşiktaş.

Career
Kaya made his professional debut with Beşiktaş in a 4-0 UEFA Europa League loss to Wolverhampton Wanderers F.C. on 12 December 2019.

References

External links
 
 

2001 births
Living people
People from Altındağ, Ankara
Turkish footballers
Turkey youth international footballers
Beşiktaş J.K. footballers
Turgutluspor footballers
Süper Lig players
Association football defenders